Goosebumps 2: Haunted Halloween (or simply Goosebumps 2 as marketed on home release) is a 2018 American horror comedy film directed by Ari Sandel and written by Rob Lieber from a story by Lieber and Darren Lemke. A stand-alone sequel to 2015's Goosebumps, it is based on the children's horror book series of the same name by R. L. Stine. The new cast consists of Wendi McLendon-Covey, Madison Iseman, Jeremy Ray Taylor, Caleel Harris, Chris Parnell, and Ken Jeong. The plot follows two young boys who accidentally release the monsters from the Goosebumps franchise in their town after opening an unpublished Goosebumps manuscript titled Haunted Halloween, causing a wave of destruction on Halloween night. 

Development of the film began in September 2015. Rob Letterman intended to return to direct, but dropped out due to scheduling conflicts with Pokémon: Detective Pikachu. Ari Sandel replaced him as director. Jack Black and Odeya Rush were set to reprise their roles as R. L. Stine and Hannah Stine, respectively; Black's role was reduced to an uncredited cameo and Rush's role was ultimately not included in the final script. 

Goosebumps 2 was released in the United States on October 12, 2018, by Sony Pictures Releasing under its Columbia Pictures label. The film received mixed reviews from critics, and was not as successful as its predecessor, grossing $93 million worldwide against its $35 million budget.

Plot

Three years after the previous movie, teenager Sarah Quinn lives with her mother, Kathy, and younger brother, Sonny, in Wardenclyffe, New York. Sarah is attempting to get into Columbia University by writing an essay about fear. Kathy agrees to watch Sonny's friend Sam Carter while his father goes out of town. Sonny and Sam are attempting to start a garbage clean-up business, and are called after school to clean up an abandoned house. Inside, they find a locked manuscript and curious, decide to open it, causing Slappy the Dummy to appear. They had unknowingly brought Slappy to life by speaking magic words found in his pocket. The manuscript is later stolen by a bully named Tommy Madigan.

At home, Sonny is working on his science project, a miniature version of Nikola Tesla's Wardenclyffe Tower. Slappy then reveals that he is alive to Sonny and Sam, and gets their trust by using his magic to do the boy's chores and homework. Meanwhile, Sarah goes to a party to meet her boyfriend Tyler Mitchell (Bryce Cass), but sees him kissing another girl. Slappy later overhears Sarah talking about Tyler and sabotages Sonny's science project. The following day on Halloween, Slappy uses his powers to attack Tyler, and Sonny accidentally damages the school science lab with his sabotaged project. Sarah questions Sonny and Sam about Slappy. The group realizes that Slappy is at fault for everything. They arrive home, and they find Kathy with Slappy and try to warn her about him but she doesn't listen and receives a call about Sonny's incident at school and grounds the trio. Kathy expresses her disappointment in Sarah.

The kids capture Slappy and try to dispose of him in a lake, but he escapes. That night, they find an article online about the events that happened in Madison, Delaware and try to contact R. L. Stine after realizing the book they found was an unpublished Goosebumps manuscript called Haunted Halloween. Stine, now living in a cabin in the woods, hears their message and departs for Wardenclyffe.

Slappy goes to a local drug store and uses his magic to bring Goosebumps character costumes and Halloween decorations to life. He also uses the haunted mask to transform an employee named Walter into a hunchbacked ogre. Slappy travels to the Wardenclyffe tower, and uses it to amplify his magic. Meanwhile, Sarah, Sonny and Sam retrieve the book from Tommy's house while all the town's Halloween decorations come to life. The trio discover that the book can trap the monsters inside. However, the book is stolen and Kathy is kidnapped by the monsters. The kids’ neighbor, Mr. Chu, a Goosebumps fan, helps them craft monster disguises to safely navigate the town.

The kids head for the Wardenclyffe Tower while Stine arrives in town. At the tower, the kids encounter Slappy and Walter and discover that Slappy has turned Kathy into a living dummy. Sonny and Sam overload the reactor while Sarah fights Slappy. She defeats Slappy by kicking him into the electrified coil atop the tower, which blasts him into the sky. Sarah opens the book and combines it with the reactor's energy to drag all the other monsters back into the Haunted Halloween manuscript, while also returning Kathy and Walter to normal. Stine arrives, congratulates the kids for defeating the monsters, and gives Sarah advice for writing her essay.

Sometime later, Kathy and Walter start dating. Sonny wins the science fair and Sarah gets an email saying she got into Columbia University.

Back in Stine's cabin, Slappy appears. He reveals that he has survived and has written a book of his own where Stine is the main character. He then opens his manuscript, sucking Stine inside.

Cast

Calaca ladies portrayed by Iyani Gwendolyn, Cheniqua Litchmore, and Hali J. Ross.

Goblins portrayed by Cody Jenkins and Joe Marri. Mummies portrayed by Mary Tricia Froedge, Robert Hunt, Martin Skyler, Grace Toso, Calvin Wickham, and Taylor Williams.

A scene briefly shows toys of Ryu and Ken from the Street Fighter series using voice clips from the games.

Production
On September 2, 2015, it was reported that a sequel to the film Goosebumps was already in the planning stages, with Sony looking for a screenwriter. On January 17, 2017, a January 26, 2018 release date was set, and Rob Letterman confirmed that he was to return as director for the sequel. On February 6, 2017, it was announced that the film's release date had been delayed to September 21, 2018, taking the date previously held by Hotel Transylvania 3: Summer Vacation.

In May 2017, the title was said to be Goosebumps: HorrorLand. At the time, it was also reported that Jack Black would reprise his role as R. L. Stine.

In November 2017, Rob Lieber was tapped to pen the script. In December 2017, Ari Sandel was announced as the director instead of Letterman, due to the latter being busy directing Pokémon: Detective Pikachu for Legendary Entertainment. Variety reported that two scripts had been written: one script in which Black would reprise his role, while the other had Black cut out entirely. In December 2017, the sequel's release date was pushed to October 12, 2018.

The film was later renamed Goosebumps: Slappy's Revenge, and its new leading cast members were set as Madison Iseman, Ben O'Brien, Caleel Harris and Jeremy Ray Taylor (O'Brien did not appear in the finished film). Ken Jeong, Chris Parnell and Wendi McLendon-Covey joined the following month. Filming began on March 7, and in April 2018 the title was renamed again, to Haunted Halloween.

It was initially stated by Sony representatives that Avery Lee Jones, who puppeteered Slappy in the film, would also voice the character. Jack Black returned for the film as Stine, and it was later reported that Mick Wingert would actually voice Slappy.

Release
Goosebumps 2: Haunted Halloween was released on October 12, 2018. The film's first trailer premiered on July 11, 2018, the international trailer on August 16, 2018, and a third trailer on September 20, 2018. A television spot was released on September 24, 2018, which also confirmed that Jack Black would return for the film. Unlike the first film where it was given RealD 3D screenings, the sequel was not in the format.

Goosebumps 2: Haunted Halloween was released on Digital on December 25th 2018 and DVD and Blu-ray on January 15, 2019.

Reception

Box office
Goosebumps 2: Haunted Halloween grossed $46.7 million in the United States and Canada, and $46.6 million in other territories, for a total worldwide gross of $93.3 million, against a production budget of $35 million. In the United States and Canada, Goosebumps 2: Haunted Halloween was released alongside First Man and Bad Times at the El Royale, and was projected to gross $15–21 million from 3,521 theaters in its opening weekend.

The film made $4.9 million on its first day, including $750,000 from Thursday night previews, up from $600,000 by the first film. It went on to debut to $15.8 million (down 33% from the first film's opening of $23.6 million), finishing fourth at the box office, behind Venom, A Star Is Born and First Man. The film dropped 38% in its second weekend, to $9.7 million, remaining in fourth.

The film was released in the United Kingdom on October 19, 2018, and opened in third, behind A Star Is Born and Halloween.

Critical response
The website's critical consensus reads, "Goosebumps 2: Haunted Halloween offers a handful of treats for very young viewers, but compared to the entertaining original, this sequel is a ding dong to ditch." On Metacritic, the film has a weighted average score of 53 out of 100, based on 20 critics, indicating "mixed or average reviews". Audiences polled by CinemaScore gave the film an average grade of "B" on an A+ to F scale, down from the "A" earned by the first film.

Bilge Ebiri, writing for Vulture, said: "The first Goosebumps movie ... had wit, speed, and an imaginative spirit, throwing all sorts of rampaging, creatively designed ghouls at us. Goosebumps 2: Haunted Halloween can’t quite make the same claim. It replicates the template and the atmosphere of the original, but it lacks invention and emotional investment", and added: "The movie feels undercooked on every level. True, it’s all meant to be slight and charming and inoffensive — but there’s a way to make this sort of thing work, and Goosebumps 2 doesn’t seem particularly interested in trying to find it."

Ignatiy Vishnevetsky of The A.V. Club gave the film a grade of C, writing: "Though the new Goosebumps 2: Haunted Halloween gets closer to the spirit of Stine’s bestselling books, it also shares their reliance on formula, recreating the first movie’s monster mash with fewer self-referential gags." He concluded: "though Sandel relies less on exasperating, rubbery digital effects than Rob Letterman, the DreamWorks Animation vet who helmed the original, his direction of the monsters and mayhem is never more than workmanlike, racing joylessly through a shaky plot that barely holds attention."

Writing for The Globe and Mail, Kate Taylor was more positive in her review of the film, giving it a score of 3 stars out of 4 and writing: "With a mere cameo from Jack Black as the reclusive Stine and fewer clever twists in the plot, Goosebumps 2 risks the diminishing-returns scenario that plagues most sequels; what saves it is a climax that is fresh rather than frantic." She concluded: "the safely scary and often amusing formula holds. Meanwhile, the movie’s conclusion includes enough plot about Stine’s fate to suggest Goosebumps 3 will feature more of the elusive Black and that can only be a good thing."

References

External links
 
 
 
 
 
 

2010s children's films
2018 comedy horror films
2010s monster movies
2018 films
American films with live action and animation
American children's animated fantasy films
American comedy horror films
American monster movies
Children's horror films
Columbia Pictures films
Columbia Pictures animated films
Films about books
American films about Halloween
Films based on American horror novels
Films based on children's books
Films based on works by R. L. Stine
Films directed by Ari Sandel
Puppet films
Films produced by Neal H. Moritz
Films scored by Dominic Lewis
Films set in New York (state)
Films shot in Atlanta
Goosebumps
Sony Pictures Animation films
Original Film films
2010s English-language films
2010s American films